Adèle of Dreux (1145 – aft. 1210) was a member of Norman French nobility, daughter of Robert I, Count of Dreux and his second wife Hawise of Salisbury.

She married Valéran III, Count of Breteuil on 24 June 1156, and had the following issue:
 Adèle (d. 1195), married Raoul le Roux.
 Amicia (1160–1226), married Baldwin de Yerres, John Briard & Gauthier de Rinsel and had issue.
 Mahaut, married Simon of Clermont (d. 1187) and had issue.

After Valéran's death in 1162, she married secondly Guy II of Châtillon. Her brother, Walter III of Châtillon, provided her dowry through the sale of Pierrefonds. They had:
 Guy III (d. 1191)
 Alix (d. 1193), married William de Garlande (d. 1216), and had issue
 Walter III of Châtillon
 Marie of Châtillon, first wife of Renaud I, Count of Dammartin, divorced 1190. (2) Married Robert de Vieuxpont.(3) Married John III, count of Vendome.

She married thirdly John I de Thorotte and had:
 John (d. 1237), married Odette de Dampierre (d. 1212) and had issue.
 Joan
 Philip

Her final marriage was to Ralph, Count of Soissons, with whom she had:
 Gertrude (d. 1220); married Matthew II of Montmorency, (d. 1230) and had issue.
 Eleanor, who married Stephen II of Sancerre (died 1252) (son of Stephen I of Sancerre) and had issue.

Adèle died after 1210.

References

Sources

House of Dreux
1145 births
13th-century deaths